Aiyas Matriculation School is an Indian public school providing from primary to higher secondary education. It is located in Thirukkalachery, Mayiladuthurai district, Tamil Nadu, India.

This school is listed with the Government of Tamil Nadu, Department of School Education -, India.

This school was opened and run by Alhaj MKM Aboobakar who is also the principal and the school correspondent.

History
 This school opened as a nursery school under the name Assalamath Islamic Nursery School in 1989. It was opened in helping the poor and educationally backward children to provide proper and good English education in this small village and also from the surrounding villages. It was built on a small land using simple construction like a big tent using coconut tree leaves for the roof.
 The nursery school expanded to include primary classes and the name changed to Assalamath Islamic Nursery & Primary School.
 Assalamath Islamic Nursery & Primary School received government recognition for its merit and popularity.
 The school got relocated to the adjacent land to a proper 2-floor school building after 10 years
 The school further expanded and was then renamed as Aiyas Matriculation Higher Secondary School in June 2001.
 In June 2003, the school again changed its name to Aiyas Matriculation School.
 In June 2010, Aiyas Matriculation School was voted one of the Best Top 10 Schools in Mayiladuthurai district.

Location
The school is built on a private land of a 2-story school building.

-- Location/Address:
6/109 Main Road, Thirukkalachery, Mayiladuthurai district, Pin: 609312, Tamil Nadu, India.

Gallery

References

Primary schools in Tamil Nadu
High schools and secondary schools in Tamil Nadu
Education in Mayiladuthurai district
Educational institutions established in 1989
1989 establishments in Tamil Nadu